Conversation Storm is a 2006  play written by playwright and composer Rick Burkhardt and originally performed by The Nonsense Company.

The performance is often paired with Great Hymn of Thanksgiving, another piece written by Burkhardt.

Summary
Three friends from three sides of the political spectrum unwillingly argue their way through a "ticking time bomb" scenario, dissecting, revising, and even brutalizing their own positions in the process — but time has either stopped or entered an ugly loop, and as the friends assign and reassign roles, the scenario begins to dissolve the boundaries between real and hypothetical, past and future, day and night.

Film
In 2007, filmmaker H.P. Mendoza was working for the San Francisco Fringe Festival and was able to see a performance of The Nonsense Company's Great Hymn of Thanksgiving/Conversation Storm and was determined to meet the troupe.  In 2008, Mendoza gave his voice to Great Hymn playwright Rick Burkhardt for his award-winning composition "Calf", performed by the ensemble Ascolta and decided to ask Burkhardt if he would be interested in making a film version of Great Hymn of Thanksgiving/Conversation Storm, called "a delicious two-course evening" by Time Out New York.

The film is slated for release in 2015.

Conversation Storm was published in Plays and Playwrights 2009, edited by Martin Denton.

Cast
 Rick Burkhardt
 Andy Gricevich
 Ryan Higgins

Awards
 2007 San Francisco Fringe Festival - Best New Play
 2008 NYC Frigid Fest - Best of Fest
 2008 NYC Frigid Fest - Audience Choice

References

External links
 Time Out New York review
 Backstage New York review
 New Theater Corps review

American plays